Jozef Hrivňák (born 17 February 1973) is a retired Slovak football striker.

References

1973 births
Living people
Slovak footballers
Partizán Bardejov players
FK Austria Wien players
SV Eintracht Trier 05 players
BV Cloppenburg players
Association football forwards
Austrian Football Bundesliga players
Slovak expatriate footballers
Expatriate footballers in Austria
Slovak expatriate sportspeople in Austria
Expatriate footballers in Germany
Slovak expatriate sportspeople in Germany